Regência: Vince Mendoza is an album by Ivan Lins and The Metropole Orchestra.

Track listing
 Daquilo que eu Sei
 A Gente Merece ser Feliz
 Formigueiro
 Arlequim Desconhecido
 Comecar De Novo
 Let Us Be Always
 E Ouro em Po
 O Fado
 Ai, Ai, Ai, Ai, Ai
 Art of Survival
 Lua Soberana

Awards

Latin Grammy Awards
The album won the 2009 Latin Grammy for Best MPB (Musica Popular Brasileira) Album. (The title of the album at the awards ceremony was simply "Ivan Lins & The Metropole Orchestra"). The album was also nominated for the following awards:
Record of the Year: "Arlequim Desconhecido"
Album of the Year: Regência: Vince Mendoza

References

2009 albums
Ivan Lins albums
Latin Grammy Award for Best MPB Album